The following is a list of the 21 cantons of the Loire department, in France, following the French canton reorganisation which came into effect in March 2015:

 Andrézieux-Bouthéon
 Boën-sur-Lignon
 Charlieu
 Le Coteau
 Feurs
 Firminy
 Montbrison
 Le Pilat
 Renaison
 Rive-de-Gier
 Roanne-1
 Roanne-2
 Saint-Chamond
 Saint-Étienne-1
 Saint-Étienne-2
 Saint-Étienne-3
 Saint-Étienne-4
 Saint-Étienne-5
 Saint-Étienne-6
 Saint-Just-Saint-Rambert
 Sorbiers

References